In mathematics, and particularly in potential theory, Dirichlet's principle is the assumption that the minimizer of a certain energy functional is a solution to Poisson's equation.

Formal statement
Dirichlet's principle states that, if the function  is the solution to Poisson's equation 

 on the  boundary ,

then u can be obtained as the minimizer of the Dirichlet energy 

 

This concept is named after the German mathematician Peter Gustav Lejeune Dirichlet.

History
The name "Dirichlet's principle" is due to Riemann, who applied it in the study of  complex analytic functions.

Riemann (and others such as Gauss and Dirichlet) knew that Dirichlet's integral is bounded below, which establishes the existence of an infimum; however, he took for granted the existence of a function that attains the minimum. Weierstrass published the first criticism of this assumption in 1870, giving an example of a functional that has a greatest lower bound which is not a minimum value. Weierstrass's example was the functional

Weierstrass showed that , but no admissible function  can make  equal 0. This example did not disprove Dirichlet's principle per se, since the example integral is different from Dirichlet's integral. But it did undermine the reasoning that Riemann had used, and spurred interest in proving Dirichlet's principle as well as broader advancements in the calculus of variations and ultimately functional analysis.

In 1900, Hilbert later justified Riemann's use of Dirichlet's principle by developing the direct method in the calculus of variations.

See also
 Dirichlet problem
 Hilbert's twentieth problem
 Plateau's problem
 Green's first identity

Notes

References

 
 
 
 

Calculus of variations
Partial differential equations
Harmonic functions
Mathematical principles